Igloo is a 1932 American pre-Code documentary film released by Universal Studios.

Production
In February 1931, Edward Small sent an expedition to the Arctic headed by Ewing Scott with Roy Klaffki as a cameraman to make a film. They were accompanied by Ray Wise, a half Eskimo, half Russian and shot for six months. They went missing for 32 days off Icy Cape, Alaska and were rescued by some whalers. They returned with 100,000 feet of film.

References

External links

Igloo at IMDb

1932 documentary films
1932 films
American documentary films
Black-and-white documentary films
Documentary films about the Arctic
Inuit films
American black-and-white films
Films produced by Edward Small
1930s English-language films
Films directed by Ewing Scott
1930s American films